Eco Park is a proposed stadium in Gloucestershire, England. If constructed, the stadium will be the home ground of  Forest Green Rovers. It is reputedly going to be the world's first timber stadium.

Architects, Zaha Hadid Architects  were chosen in November 2016 following a design competition.

The stadium was granted planning permission by Stroud District Council in December 2019 following amendments having initially been rejected in June 2019.

References 

Football venues in Gloucestershire
Sports venues in Gloucestershire
Forest Green Rovers F.C.
Sustainable buildings and structures